The Lower West Akim constituency is in the Eastern region of Ghana. The current member of Parliament for the constituency is Gifty Klenam. She was elected on the ticket of the New Patriotic Party (NPP) who finished 8,310 votes ahead of the next candidate. She succeeded James Appietu-Ankrah who had represented the constituency in the 4th Republican parliament also on the ticket of the NPP.

See also
List of Ghana Parliament constituencies

References

Parliamentary constituencies in the Eastern Region (Ghana)